Wol, WoL or WOL may refer to:

Computing
 Wake-on-LAN, (/wɒl/) an Ethernet standard that allows computers to be powered on by a network message
 An unofficial initialism for Web Ontology Language
 .wol, file extension for the WOLF eBook file format
 World Online, a defunct European internet service provider
 Write-only language, a programming which facilitates hard to read code

Computer games
 War of Legends, (/wɒl/) a fantasy real-time strategy game published by Jagex Games Studio
 Warhammer Online, abbreviation used internally by Games Workshop staff
 StarCraft II: Wings of Liberty
 Westwood Online, multi-player game mode by Westwood Studios, superseded by XWIS

Transport
 Illawarra Regional Airport
 Wood Lane tube station, London, London Underground station code

Other uses
 Owl (Winnie the Pooh), character in the Winnie the Pooh stories, who spells his name "Wol"
 Wide outside lane, in bicycle transportation engineering
 WOL (AM), a radio station in Washington, D.C.

See also
Word of Life (disambiguation)